The 2008–09 A1 Grand Prix of Nations, Netherlands was an A1 Grand Prix race, held at Circuit Park Zandvoort, Zandvoort, Netherlands. It was originally set to be the second race of the 2008–09 A1 Grand Prix season, but a delay in the build schedule of the new chassis forced the race at Mugello to be moved from the season opener. The same build delay meant that only seventeen of the twenty-three A1 teams participated in the race.

This was the first race for  A1 Team Korea (Hwang Jin-Woo),  A1 Team Monaco (Clivio Piccione), and the new "Powered by Ferrari" A1GP car.

Drivers and teams 
On 26 September, an article on the official A1GP website, detailed that a full grid of cars would not be on track at Zandvoort for the race weekend, due to the build schedule delay. It was subsequently confirmed that a maximum of eighteen teams will be racing –  Canada,  Germany (Michael Ammermüller),  Great Britain (Danny Watts),  India (Narain Karthikeyan) and  Mexico (Davíd Garza Pérez) will thus make their season debut at the second round in China.  Germany (Michael Ammermüller) did not, in fact, debut until round 5 in South Africa, while  Canada did not appear all season.

Subsequently,  Team Pakistan revealed that technical issues with their car were compromising the safety of their driver, Adam Khan – and thus, they too delayed the start of their season, leaving 17 teams to race. Like  Canada,  Pakistan did not appear all season.

As several teams were still arriving as of Saturday morning, and were unable to shake down their cars before the start of the planned sessions, rookie sessions were not held.

Qualifying
As some teams had only arrived on Saturday morning, the qualifying format was changed for Zandvoort. In place of the usual four fifteen-minute, single-lap sessions, teams were given a one-hour session in which they could complete as many laps as they wished. Those times would set the grid for the Sprint race, while the results from the Sprint race would determine the grid for the Feature race.

The pole position time, set by  the Netherlands (Jeroen Bleekemolen) was four seconds quicker than the fastest lap set the previous year in the Lola/Zytek cars.  Bleekemolen lined up on pole, 0.316s ahead of  Earl Bamber and 0.338s ahead of  Adam Carroll in third. Both  Felipe Guimarães and  Ho-Pin Tung failed to set a time.

Sprint Race
Owing to the treacherous conditions, the 12-lap Sprint Race was started behind the Safety Car. The newly introduced mandatory Sprint race pit-stop was removed for this race, to help the teams to conserve equipment.

On Lap 2, the Safety Car pulled in, and the cars were released.
On Lap 3,  Adam Carroll spun at the final corner and was hit by  Clivio Piccione, forcing both of their retirements.
On Lap 3,  Satrio Hermanto also retired after a spin.
On Lap 5,  Hwang Jin-Woo retired, after colliding with  John Martin heading into the first corner. Martin managed to continue.
On Lap 7,  Earl Bamber passed  Jeroen Bleekemolen for the lead, after a failed passing attempt led to Bleekemolen running wide and allowing Bamber to pass.
On Lap 9,  Fairuz Fauzy passed  Bamber for the lead, and then began to build up a lead over the New Zealander.
On Lap 11,  Ho-Pin Tung spun out of fifth place.
On Lap 11,  Felipe Guimarães also spun out.

The race was red-flagged on Lap 12, because of the treacherous conditions.  Fauzy won ahead of  Bamber, and  Loïc Duval.  Duval also set fastest lap.

Race stopped after 12 laps because of the terrible conditions

Feature Race
 Korea (Hwang Jin-Woo) were sent to the back of the grid for attempting to overtake under a yellow flag, and causing an avoidable collision in the Sprint race.

The second pit-stop window was set to be between Laps 24 and 32. As conditions hadn't improved since earlier, the race was started behind the Safety Car.

The Safety Car pulled in at the end of Lap 2, to get the race underway. On Lap 5,  Neel Jani pulled into the pits and retires, while  Adam Carroll spun out at Turn 6. On Lap 6,  Fabio Onidi spun and collected  Adrian Zaugg, putting both out of the race. After the first set of pit-stops,  France (Loïc Duval) led from  New Zealand (Earl Bamber) and  Portugal (Filipe Albuquerque).

A lot of action took place on Laps 16–17:  Jeroen Bleekemolen pulled into the pits with a steering wheel problem;  Indonesia (Satrio Hermanto) crashed out;  Korea (Hwang Jin-Woo) spun and rejoined; and  Portugal (Filipe Albuquerque) spun and crashed in the final turn. The Safety Car was deployed while the wrecks were cleared. At this point, all remaining cars in the race were guaranteed points-finishes, which means  Monaco (Clivio Piccione) and  Korea (Hwang Jin-Woo) would score on their debut, and  Lebanon (Daniel Morad) would score their first ever points.

On Lap 24,  Daniel Morad did a 360-spin and continues, losing a place to  John Martin. Meanwhile,  Netherlands (Jeroen Bleekemolen) were having gearshifting problems and lost a place to  USA (Charlie Kimball). On Lap 31,  Charlie Kimball retired after running off the track, but not before setting the fastest lap of the race.  France (Loïc Duval) still led after the second round of pit-stops.

On Lap 33, the Safety Car was deployed after  Morad lost control and spun into the back of  Ho-Pin Tung, sending both cars into the tyre wall at Tarzan corner. At this stage, the race had nearly reached the 69-minute time limit. Two laps later the time expired, and  France (Loïc Duval) took the chequered flag behind the safety car, ahead of  Malaysia (Fairuz Fauzy), and  New Zealand (Earl Bamber).

 Brazil (Felipe Guimarães) joined the race late on, after being unable to make the start, as they were unable to repair the damage from their accident in the Sprint race in time.

Scheduled for 45 laps but stopped earlier because of time limit

After race 
At the first practice session,  Korea (Hwang Jin-Woo) was warned due to their political insistence which the team put on the car: Dokdo is a territory of Korea. However, they kept running the car with same insistence written in not English but Korean (Hangul) during the race weekend. As a result, the team received a penalty of fine after the race.

Notes
It was the 33rd race weekend (66 starts).
It was the 3rd race in the Netherlands, and the 3rd race at Circuit Park Zandvoort.
It was the first race weekend for  A1 Team Korea (Hwang Jin-Woo), and  A1 Team Monaco (Clivio Piccione).
It was the first race weekend as main driver for  Earl Bamber,  Felipe Guimarães,  Hwang Jin-Woo,  Charlie Kimball,  Daniel Morad,  Fabio Onidi and  Clivio Piccione.
Records:
In the Sprint race, it was the first win for  Malaysia and Fairuz Fauzy.
 Lebanon (Daniel Morad) had participated in 33 rounds (63 starts) before scoring their first points.
 Korea (Hwang Jin-Woo),  Lebanon (Daniel Morad) and  Monaco (Clivio Piccione) all scored their first ever points in the series, in the Feature race.

References

External links
Malaysia wins Sprint race 
Sprint race: as it happened
Sprint race results
France masters Zandvoort
Feature race: as it happened
Main race results

A1 Grand Prix Of Nations, Netherlands, 2008-09
Grand Prix race